Marcin Robak (born 29 November 1982) is a Polish former professional footballer who played as a forward. Between 2010 and 2014, he made nine appearances scoring one goal for the Poland national team.

Club career
Robak's first club in Ekstraklasa was Korona Kielce, where he made his debut on 25 March 2006. In the next season, he became the first striker of Korona and scored ten goals in the 2007–08 season.

He moved from Korona to Widzew Łódź in the next season and was one of the best strikers in I liga, scoring 20 goals in his first season with the club. Widzew, with Robak on board, won promotion to Ekstraklasa the next season, and the in-form Robak received a call-up to the Poland national team.

In the middle of the 2010–11 season, he moved to Konyaspor in Turkey. After the club was relegated in the 2011–12 season, he moved to Mersin İdmanyurdu, where he played just for the half of the season.

Robak returned to Poland and signed a contract with Piast Gliwice. On 13 August 2013, Robak moved to Pogoń Szczecin and was the top goalscorer in Ekstraklasa with 22 goals in the 2013–14 season. His last season in Pogoń was full of injuries and Robak only managed 17 leagues appearances.

Before the 2015–16 season, he moved to defending champions Lech Poznań on a two-year contract. In the 2016–17 season, he scored 18 league goals and for the second time was crowned the top scorer in Ekstraklasa, alongside Marco Paixão.

In 2017, he signed a contract with Śląsk Wrocław. On 30 April 2018, Robak scored his 100th goal in Ekstraklasa.

In the 2019–20 season, Robak made a surprise return to Widzew, at the time playing in the Polish third division. The team managed to win a promotion with him as team captain. Robak left the club in the summer of 2021.

Career statistics

Club

1 Including Polish SuperCup and Ekstraklasa Cup.

International goals
Score and result list Poland's goal tally first, score column indicates score after Robak goal.

Honours
Lech Poznań
 Polish Super Cup: 2015, 2016

Widzew Łódź
 I liga: 2008–09, 2009–10

Individual
 Ekstraklasa top scorer: 2013–14, 2016–17

References

External links
 
 

1982 births
Living people
People from Legnica
Sportspeople from Lower Silesian Voivodeship
Association football forwards
Polish footballers
Poland international footballers
Miedź Legnica players
Korona Kielce players
Widzew Łódź players
Konyaspor footballers
Piast Gliwice players
Pogoń Szczecin players
Lech Poznań players
Śląsk Wrocław players
Ekstraklasa players
I liga players
II liga players
Süper Lig players
TFF First League players
Polish expatriate footballers
Polish expatriate sportspeople in Turkey
Expatriate footballers in Turkey